The Yemen club's history of playing in the AFC Cup.

Participations

See also
 AFC Cup

Football clubs in the AFC Cup